Torstein Blixfjord is a Norwegian artist who works with film, performance, poetry and photography. He began directing theatre in 1990 with a series of adaptations of plays by Strindberg and Ibsen, to whose work Blixfjord has often returned. Following these productions, he went on to work with multimedia, and later to direct film in 2000. He is best known as a film director and producer.

As Film Director

Multimedia Work

As Theatre Director

Producer
In 2012 Blixfjord produced Jorgen Friband's feature documentary Shakespeare: The Hidden Truth, which premiered in Norway on 14 April 2012, and will be released in the UK later this year.

In 2004 Blixfjord was Executive Producer of Brixton Stories- a series of short films that  featured the London borough of Brixton. Brixton Stories was produced by Arts Alliance and Insight News Television.

References

External links
 Torstein Blixfjord official website
 Shakespeare: The Hidden Truth official website
 Brixton Stories official website
 Short film from Yokohama production of Blixfjord's 'Terje'
 Blixfjord's 'Juleaften' on Youtube

Living people
Norwegian theatre directors
Norwegian documentary filmmakers
Norwegian film directors
Norwegian film producers
1966 births